Le Crès (Languedocien: Lo Crèç) is a commune in the Hérault department in southern France. The town has three football stadiums and a secondary school. Every year there is a village party with bulls in the arena and in the streets.

Population

See also
Communes of the Hérault department
 Castelnau-le Crès FC

References

Communes of Hérault